Mitrobryum koelzii is a species of moss in the family Dicranaceae. It is endemic to India, where it is known from only two sites in Uttar Pradesh. It is an endangered species that is threatened by human activity in its mountain forest habitat.

References

Dicranales
Endemic flora of India (region)
Endangered plants
Taxonomy articles created by Polbot